The 2013–14 North West Counties Football League season was the 32nd in the history of the North West Counties Football League, a football competition in England. Teams were divided into two divisions: the Premier Division and Division One.

Premier Division 

The Premier Division featured two new teams:

 Abbey Hey promoted as runners-up of Division One
 West Didsbury & Chorlton promoted from Division One

Bacup & Rossendale Borough, who finished the season in one of the relegation positions, were reprieved.

League table

Promotion criteria
To be promoted at the end of the season a team must:
 Have applied to be considered for promotion by 30 November 2013
 Pass a ground grading examination by 31 March 2014
 Finish the season in a position higher than that of any other team also achieving criteria 1 and 2
 Finish the season in one of the top three positions
The following eight teams have achieved criterion 1:
 A.F.C. Liverpool
 Bootle
 Congleton
 Glossop North End
 Maine Road
 Norton United
 Runcorn Linnets
 Runcorn Town

Results

Locations

Division One 

Division One featured three new teams:

 Hanley Town promoted as champions of the Staffordshire County Senior League Premier Division
 1874 Northwich accepted as a newly formed club.
 Widnes Vikings accepted from the West Cheshire League Third Division, where they played as Widnes Town.

League table

Results

Locations

League Challenge Cup

First round
Each Premier Division club, together with Ashton Town of Division One, received a bye to the second round.

Second round

Third round

Replay

Fourth round

Semi–Finals
Played over two legs

Maine Road win 6–1 on aggregate

Ashton Athletic win 6–2 on aggregate

Final
Played at Curzon Ashton's Tameside Stadium

First Division Trophy

First round
Each of the remaining thirteen Division One clubs received a bye to the second round.

Second round

Third round

Semi-finals
Played over two legs

Hanley Town win 5–4 on aggregate

Formby win 6–4 on aggregate

Final
Played at Runcorn Linnets' Millbank Linnets Stadium

Formby win on penalties, 5–3

References

External links 
 nwcfl.com (The Official Website of The North West Counties Football League)

North West Counties Football League seasons
9